Ryan Daut (born April 18, 1984) is an American professional poker player from New Jersey.  After earning a degree in mathematics and computer science from the University of Richmond in 2006, Daut began work on a doctorate in mathematics at Penn State University.  He dropped out of the program after one semester to play poker professionally.

Ryan Daut started out competitive gaming in StarCraft and StarCraft: Brood War. He was an avid poster on teamliquid.net posting strategies and guides. Around 2003 when the poker boom hit he shifted into poker along with many other notable starcraft players, Bertrand "Elky" Grosspellier, Guillaume "Grrrr" Patry, Dan "Rekrul" Schreiber, Hevad "Rain" Khan, etc.

On January 10, 2007 Daut won a World Poker Tour event at the PokerStars Caribbean Poker Adventure.  He defeated Isaac Haxton heads up and won $1,535,255 for first place.

As of 2010, his total live tournament winnings exceed $1,800,000.

References

External links
 Hendon Mob tournament results
 Interview with Ryan Daut

American poker players
World Poker Tour winners
1984 births
Living people